Cowits was Western Australia's first Aboriginal policeman, and was a member of a number of early exploratory expeditions.

Cowits and his brother, Souper 
Cowits came from the York area.  He was born around 1832.  He had a brother named Souper.

Souper was sentenced to two years prison on Rottnest Island for stealing a sheep from Burges’ farm.  His story was set out in a report to Benefit Societies in England, and published in the Perth Gazette in September 1844, when he was reportedly about 11 years of age. In that story, he gives an account of his time at Rottnest and says that his mother and father and uncles were all dead, but he had a brother in York.

Young Cowits 
Cowits was one of four Aboriginal children who were taught the alphabet by Peter Barrow during his 18 months in York in 1840 and 1841.

From 1841, Cowits was being brought up in the house of Dr Henry Landor, a settler, physician, scientist and explorer, and one of three brothers who came to the Swan River Colony in 1841 intending to make a fortune in six or seven years from sheep farming. In the York census of 1842, Cowits is referred to as “working for settlers in the York (Avon) District”.

Landor farmed in partnership with Nathan Elias Knight, leasing Bland and Trimmer's farm in York, Balladong Farm, and squatting sheep at the Dale and Hotham. While there, Landor became concerned with the spread of disease among the Aborigines. It was his opinion that contact with white settlers had been the cause of the virulent diseases. He took it upon himself to gather as many Aborigines as he could to look after them properly, and he applied unsuccessfully for government money for a hospital, though received some funds for medical treatment.

In January 1843, Landor and Henry Maxwell Lefroy explored east of “the Dale” (Beverley) and took Cowits with them “to shoot kangaroos, and to act as interpreter when our guides were unintelligible to us”.

In December 1844, Landor explored the Deep River, discovering a "tree so high (63 paces to the first branch) that he could not look over it". A storm came and Landor and his "servant" took shelter in the hollow of an old jarrah tree that was so large it could even hold the horses.

Landor left the Colony in 1845.

Cowits begins to assist the police 
Cowits assisted John Drummond, head of police in York, then Toodyay.
When Walkinshaw Cowan was appointed Protector of Natives and head of police in York in 1848, Drummond asked Cowits to convey a message to Cowan.  Cowan recorded in his diary and also wrote in 1868 about this: 

However, Cowan began to complain about Drummond. In April 1850, a court of inquiry was held at York to enquire into Cowan's complaints. One of these was that Drummond went drinking at the Kings Head Hotel with Cowits and Tommy the native mail carrier, and did not report or charge anyone. Cowits gave evidence for Drummond which the court believed. The court found the charges "not proved being frivolous and vexatious", though Drummond was suspended from duties for a month.

Also in April 1850, Cowits is recorded as having given evidence in a trial of three Aboriginal people for the murder of Yadupwert; all three were convicted and sentenced to death.

Cowan tries to get a house for Cowits
Despite these difficulties between Cowan and Drummond, Cowan formed a good relationship with Cowits and on 26 August 1850, Cowan wrote to the Governor on behalf of Cowits: 
 
Cowan did not receive a reply to his letter on behalf of Cowits and wrote again on 28 October 1851:
 
Governor Fitzgerald responded:

In 1852, the prison cells were constructed in York on the area selected by Cowan for Cowits' house, being the first buildings of the current York Courthouse Complex.

Brothers 
Apart from Souper, Cowits' brothers were reportedly Nurgap, Dide, Nortap and Billiup.  Souper also became an Aboriginal policeman, as did other brothers.  In 1852, one brother was a servant of Mr Parker.

Souper accidentally shot himself in the thigh in February 1853 in the course of arresting an Aboriginal escapee named Paddy.

Further expeditions 
In 1863, Cowits accompanied Lefroy on his expedition east of York to the interior. 
Cowits was described by Lefroy as 

The journal of the expedition frequently refers to Cowits’ active and important role in the exploration.  Lefroy comments with amusement that Cowits always called their camp “home”.
The expedition also took with them a friend of Cowits, Tommy Windich.
John Cowan and Cowits proceeded  beyond Smith’s station, and both had returned to York by mid October 1863.

Cowits also accompanied an expedition of Charles Cooke Hunt to the east of York in 1864, and again in July 1866 (including Windich), and an expedition of McRae and Scholl to the Fortescue in August and September 1866.

He also worked on farms including Grass Dale, as did Windich.

Discovery of petroleum 
Cowits and Windich joined Constable Edwards in the police expedition east in May 1866 which discovered petroleum.

Death
Cowits died of influenza, aggravated by drinking, in April 1868.
Cowan said of him:

Notes

References

1830s births
1868 deaths
Australian explorers
Explorers of Western Australia
Noongar people
People from the Wheatbelt (Western Australia)